is a Japanese professional baseball Catcher for the Fukuoka SoftBank Hawks of Nippon Professional Baseball.

Professional career
On October 25, 2018, Watanabe was drafted by the Fukuoka Softbank Hawks as a developmental player in the 2018 Nippon Professional Baseball draft.

In 2019–2021 season, he played in informal matches against the Shikoku Island League Plus's teams and amateur baseball teams, and played in the Western League of NPB's second league.

August 30, 2021,  he re-signed a ¥6 million contract with the Fukuoka SoftBank Hawks as a registered player under control.

On May 24, 2022, Watanabe made his First League debut in the Interleague play (NPB) against the Yokohama DeNA BayStars. On May 28, he played as a starting member in the match against the Hiroshima Toyo Carp and recorded his first Home run. In 2022 season, he finished the regular season in 20 games with a batting average of .273, a 3 home runs and a RBI of 9.

References

External links

 Career statistics - NPB.jp
 79 Riku Watanabe PLAYERS2022 - Fukuoka SoftBank Hawks Official site

2000 births
Living people
Fukuoka SoftBank Hawks players
Japanese baseball players
Nippon Professional Baseball catchers
Baseball people from Kumamoto Prefecture